Hajiagha Hajili (born on 30 January 1998) is an Azerbaijani footballer who plays as a midfielder for Zira in the Azerbaijan Premier League and the Azerbaijan U21.

Club career
Hajili made his debut in the Azerbaijan Premier League for Gabala on 24 February 2018, match against Sabail.

In January 2019, Hajili signed a four-years contract with Qarabağ.

On 1 August 2020, Zira FK announced the signing of Hajili on one-year long loan.

Honours
Qarabağ
Azerbaijan Premier League (2): 2018–19, 2019–20

References

External links
 

1998 births
Living people
Association football midfielders
Azerbaijani footballers
Azerbaijan youth international footballers
Azerbaijan under-21 international footballers
Azerbaijan Premier League players
Gabala FC players
Qarabağ FK players
Zira FK players